Andrea Borgnis (30 March 1930 – 15 May 1980) was an Italian weightlifter. He competed in the men's middle heavyweight event at the 1960 Summer Olympics.

References

External links
 

1930 births
1980 deaths
Italian male weightlifters
Olympic weightlifters of Italy
Weightlifters at the 1960 Summer Olympics
Sportspeople from the Province of Verbano-Cusio-Ossola

People from Craveggia
20th-century Italian people